Ball de bastons (stick dance) is the name of a ritual weapon dance spread throughout Europe and the rest of the Iberian area (cossiers in Majorca, Portuguese pauliteiros, Aragonese palotiau, Basque ezpatadantza and Spanish paloteo or troqueado) but mostly in Catalonia. English and Welsh Morris dances are well-known relatives to these traditions. The origins of dance are difficult to reference; first recorded mention dates to 1150, in a banquet of Count Berenguer IV)

Most melodies are based on easy 2/4 rhythms.  Instrumentarium includes tabor pipe, shawm or bagpipes. Some of these tunes as Villano de Zamora were strikingly popular grounds among European Renaissance and Baroque composers.

In the most common set, two opposite rows of dancers elaborate some patterns of stick-clashing.  Sometimes, a peculiar chief character directs the movements and changes.  The dancers may wear white skirts or short trousers, as well as red ribbons and ornaments.

See also
Dandiya Raas
Călușari

References 

Catalan folk dances
Dance forms in classical music
Articles containing video clips